Hassania Sidi Slimane is a Moroccan football club currently playing in the third division. The club is located in the town of Sidi Slimane.

References

Football clubs in Morocco
Sports clubs in Morocco